Douglas de Silva (born 19 May 1974 in São Paulo, Brazil) is a retired Brazilian professional footballer, who played as a midfielder and defender for various teams, including Santos FC, East Bengal FC.

Career
Douglas Silva started his career with the youth academy of Palmeiras FC in Brazil and got his major break when he signed for Santos FC in São Paulo in 1995. In 2002, he signed for East Bengal FC in India and won 11 trophies in 3 years at the club, including two back-to-back National Football League titles and ASEAN Club Championship title in 2003 in Jakarta defeating BEC Tero Sasana 3-1 in the final. He also had brief stints with other clubs in Kolkata - Mohammedan Sporting in 2005-06 and Mohun Bagan in 2006-08. He retired in 2013, after playing a solitary season for Kolkata club Bhawanipore F.C.

In 2014, Douglas took over as the head coach of Mohun Bagan SAIL Academy, however, he left after one year. In 2019, he was appointed as the head coach of newly-promoted side TRAU F.C. who will be playing in the 2019-20 I-League.

East Bengal FC (2002-2005) 
In 2002, Douglas signed for East Bengal FC along with compatriot Gilmar da Silva. Under coach Subhash Bhowmick, East Bengal FC went on to win all 5 tournaments they participated in: National Football League, 2002 Calcutta League, 2002 Durand Cup, 2002 IFA Shield and 2002 Independence Day Cup.

In 2003, Douglas helped East Bengal FC win the ASEAN Club Championship title. He also helped the team win back-to-back National Football League title.

In 2004, Douglas became the top scorer of Calcutta Football League by scoring 9 goals and helped East Bengal FC win it 3 times in a row. He also won the 2004 Durand Cup with the Red and Gold before he left the club after an injury during the season.

He won 11 trophies with the club in his 3 years at East Bengal FC.

Coaching career

TRAU: 2019
On  23 October 2019, it was announced that Douglas Silva would take over as head coach of I-League side TRAU. He coached his first game for the club on 1 December 2019 against Chennai City FC.

Statistics

Managerial statistics
.

Honours

Club
East Bengal FC
National Football League:  2002-03, 2003-04
ASEAN Club Championship: 2003
Calcutta Football League: 2002, 2003, 2004
Durand Cup: 2002, 2004
IFA Shield: 2002
San Miguel International Cup: 2004
Independence Day Cup: 2002

Mohun Bagan
Federation Cup: 2006
Calcutta Football League: 2007

References

Further reading

Chatterjee, Partha. The Nation and Its Fragments: Colonial and Post-colonial Histories (Calcutta: Oxford University Press, 1995).

External links

1974 births
Living people
Brazilian footballers
I-League players
East Bengal Club players
Mohun Bagan AC players
Association football midfielders
Association football defenders
TRAU FC managers
I-League managers
Calcutta Football League players
Footballers from São Paulo
Brazilian expatriate footballers
Expatriate footballers in India
Brazilian expatriate sportspeople in India
Brazilian expatriate football managers
Expatriate football managers in India